Lee Wing-tat (born 25 December 1955) is a former Member of the Legislative Council of Hong Kong (LegCo), returned by direct election as representative of the New Territories West constituency. He was the former third Chairman of the Democratic Party (DP). He is seen as a conservative inside the party.

Early life
A Hakka, Lee was elected vice-chairman of the Hong Kong University Students' Union in 1979. He graduated from the Faculty of Science of the University of Hong Kong with a pass. He first participated in politics in the 1980s and was the vice-chairman of the Association for Democracy and People's Livelihood (ADPL). He was elected to the District Council and the Regional Council in 1985 and 1986 respectively. He was a founding member of the Hong Kong Alliance in Support of Patriotic Democratic Movements of China.

In 1989, during the visit of Geoffrey Howe to Hong Kong, Lee protested at the conference and called Howe's speech "bullshit".

Lee left the ADPL and formed the United Democrats of Hong Kong, which developed into the Democratic Party in 1994. He was elected to the Legco in the same year. He once lost his seat in the 2000 election but was re-elected in 2004. He was vice-chairman of Democratic Party from 2002 to 2004 and was elected chairman at the sixth AGM of the DP in succession to Yeung Sum. His challenger for the Chairman's post, Chan King-ming, was elected vice-chairman instead.

Chairmanship of Democratic Party

Chief Executive Election
In May 2005, Lee declared his intention to run in the Hong Kong Chief Executive Election, but only received 52 nominations and thus failed to get on the ballot. As a result, he withdrew from the election on 15 June. His participation in the election faced great criticisms within the party and the pro-democracy camp.

Criticisms
Lee was criticized for suppressing the second-tier members and "Young Turks" of the party. In early 2006, someone alleged to the Apple Daily that some senior members were involved in spying activities of China. The "suspects" were all Young Turks and included vice-chairman Chan King Ming and Gary Fan. The Young Turks later held a press conference to criticise the list of "suspects", with some even directly naming Lee as responsible.

Departure
Lee did not seek a second term as party chairman in the party's internal elections in December 2006.

Views, policy positions and Legco voting
In June 2010, he voted with the party in favour of the government's 2012 constitutional reform package, which included the late amendment by the Democratic Party – accepted by the Beijing government – to hold a popular vote for five new District Council functional constituencies.

References

External links
Personal Website
Facebook

1955 births
Living people
Alumni of St. Paul's College, Hong Kong
Alumni of the University of Hong Kong
District councillors of Kwai Tsing District
Members of the Regional Council of Hong Kong
Hong Kong people of Hakka descent
Indigenous inhabitants of the New Territories in Hong Kong
People from Huiyang
Leaders of political parties
Charter 08 signatories
Democratic Party (Hong Kong) politicians
Hong Kong Association for Democracy and People's Livelihood politicians
United Democrats of Hong Kong politicians
HK LegCo Members 1991–1995
HK LegCo Members 1995–1997
HK LegCo Members 1998–2000
HK LegCo Members 2004–2008
HK LegCo Members 2008–2012
Hong Kong Basic Law Consultative Committee members